Chonbuk National University School is one of the professional graduate schools of Chonbuk National University University, located in Jeonju, South Korea. Founded in 2009, it is one of the founding law schools in South Korea and is one of the medium size schools with each class in the three-year J.D. program having approximately 70 students.

Programs
Chonbuk National University School of Law aims to cultivate global leaders of legal professionals specialized in the laws of East Asia.

References

Website 
 Official Website

Law schools in South Korea
Educational institutions established in 2009
2009 establishments in South Korea